Kanthan – The Lover of Colour is a 2018 Indian Malayalam-language drama film written by Pramod Kooveri and directed by Shareef Easa. It is produced by Shareef Easa under the banner of Rolling Pix Entertainment and has Prajith and social activist Daya Bai in the lead roles. The film won the 2018 Kerala State Film Award for Best Film. The film was released OTT in 2021.

Plot
Set in Wayanad Thirunelly Nangara adivasi colony, the film tells the story of Kanthan, who became an orphan at a young age. 80 year old Ithyamma takes him under her wings and helps him face the world and its challenges.

Cast
Prajith as Kanthan
Daya Bai as Ithyamma
Chinnan
Kurumatti
Sujayan
Akash
Kariyan

Awards 
49th Kerala State Film Awards (2018)
 Kerala State Film Award for Best Film

References

External links
 

Films about social issues in India
2010s Malayalam-language films
2018 films